Dendropsophus haraldschultzi is a species of frog in the family Hylidae.
It is found in Brazil, Peru, possibly Bolivia, and possibly Colombia.
Its natural habitats are subtropical or tropical moist lowland forests, rivers, freshwater marshes, and intermittent freshwater marshes.
It is threatened by habitat loss.

References

haraldschultzi
Amphibians described in 1962
Taxonomy articles created by Polbot